State Museum Hotwar is an Indian cultural museum located in Ranchi, in the Indian state of Jharkhand. The current secretary of the museum is Vandana Dandel.

History 
The museum's original name was Ranchi Museum. It was established on the premises of the Tribal Research Institute in 1974. Confined within the boundaries of the building, it moved to a new site in Hotwar, Ranchi. On 10 September 2009, the museum was inaugurated by Vice President Mohammad Hamid Ansari of India.

The museum was built to express the cultural heritage of Jharkhand. It has ten galleries, and contains paintings by artists from many states such as Bengal, Orissa, and Bihar. The museum has a library that  is well-equipped library and can house up to 300 people.

References 

Museums in Ranchi
2009 establishments in Jharkhand
Museums established in 2009